Great White North may refer to:
"Great White North", a recurring SCTV sketch featuring Bob and Doug McKenzie
The Great White North (album), a comedy album by Bob and Doug McKenzie (Rick Moranis and Dave Thomas)
Great White North Records, former Canadian independent record label
This Great White North, a weekly radio show featuring independent Canadian music on KOOP-FM 91.7 in Austin, TX

See also
Canada, a country in North America
Arctic, the northernmost part of Earth